The AEW TBS Championship is a women's professional wrestling television championship created and promoted by the American promotion All Elite Wrestling (AEW). Established on October 6, 2021, it is the secondary championship of the promotion's female division. It is named after the TBS television network, which currently airs AEW's flagship program, Dynamite. The current and inaugural champion is Jade Cargill, who is in her first reign.

History

In March 2020, All Elite Wrestling (AEW) established the AEW TNT Championship as a secondary championship for the men's division, named after the TNT television network, owned by WarnerMedia. In May 2021, it was announced that AEW's flagship program, Dynamite, would be moving from TNT to the network's sister channel, TBS, also owned by WarnerMedia, in January 2022, while AEW's other core program, Rampage, would remain on TNT. Despite Dynamite moving to TBS, wrestling journalist Dave Meltzer reported that the TNT Championship would not be renamed. Then-AEW executive and wrestler Cody Rhodes also affirmed that there were no plans to rename the championship and that there were no plans for a separate TBS Championship for male wrestlers. It was later reported that the promotion would introduce a secondary women's championship and it would instead be called the TBS Championship.

Prior to the October 6, 2021, second anniversary episode of Dynamite, AEW President and Chief Executive Officer Tony Khan said there would be a major announcement made on the show. During the episode, AEW commentator Tony Schiavone and referee Aubrey Edwards officially unveiled the AEW TBS Championship as a secondary championship for the women's division. AEW announced that the inaugural champion would be determined by a single-elimination tournament. The tournament bracket was revealed on the October 22 episode of Rampage with a 12-woman field. The tournament itself began on the October 23 episode of Dynamite and concluded on the January 5, 2022, episode, the show's debut broadcast on TBS. In the tournament final, Jade Cargill defeated Ruby Soho to become the inaugural TBS Champion.

TBS Championship Tournament 
On the October 22, 2021, episode of Rampage, the participants of the inaugural TBS Championship Tournament were revealed. Tony Khan announced on Busted Open Radio that the tournament would have a 12-woman field with four of them receiving a first round bye.

Belt design
The TBS Championship belt design is nearly identical to the men's TNT Championship, with a couple of notable differences. The belt has six plates on a black leather strap. The center plate prominently features a relief TBS network logo at the center. Above the TBS logo is AEW's logo, while below the TBS logo is a blue banner that says "CHAMPION" (countering the red banner on the TNT title). The two inner side plates are the same as the TNT Championship, featuring "Tara on Techwood", 1050 Techwood Drive in Atlanta, the building that was the original home of both TNT and TBS. Also like the TNT title, the two outer side plates feature AEW's logo, while a third smaller side plate on the far right side also features the promotion's logo. This and the original TNT belt it was based on were originally commissioned by AEW and designed by Red Leather, and the actual construction of the belt was completed by Rey Rey Championship Belts.

Title history

References

External links
 Official AEW TBS Championship Title History

2022 introductions
All Elite Wrestling championships
Television wrestling championships
Women's professional wrestling championships